Arthotheliopsis is a genus of fungi in the family Gomphillaceae. It has 5 species. The genus was circumscribed by Finnish lichenologist Edvard August Vainio in 1896, with A. hymenocarpoides assigned as the type species.

Species
Arthotheliopsis floridensis 
Arthotheliopsis hymenocarpoides 
Arthotheliopsis planicarpa 
Arthotheliopsis serusiauxii 
Arthotheliopsis tricharioides

References

Ostropales
Lichen genera
Ostropales genera
Taxa described in 1896
Taxa named by Edvard August Vainio